A chapada is a plateau found in the Brazilian Highlands. The chapadas, which are usually described as mountain ranges, are capped by horizontal strata of sandstone. They show the original surface, which has been worn away by the rivers, leaving here and there broad flat-topped ridges between river basins and narrower ranges of hills between river courses. From the valleys their rugged, deeply indented escarpments, stretching away to the horizon, they have the appearance of a continuous chain of mountains.

See also
 Chapada do Araripe
 Chapada Diamantina
 Chapada dos Guimarães
 Chapada das Mangabeiras
 Chapada dos Veadeiros

References

Escarpments
Plateaus of Brazil
Mountain ranges of Brazil